Toxicodryas blandingii, commonly known as Blanding's cat snake, Blanding's tree snake, and Blandings [sic] tree snake, is a species of rear-fanged venomous snake of the family Colubridae. The species is endemic to Sub-Saharan Africa.

Etymology
The specific name, blandingii, is in honor of William Blanding (1772–1857), an American physician and naturalist.

Geographic range
T. blandingii is found in Angola, Benin, Cameroon, Central African Republic, Congo, DR Congo, Equatorial Guinea, Gabon, Gambia, Ghana, Guinea, Guinea-Bissau, Ivory Coast, Kenya, Liberia, Nigeria, Senegal, Sierra Leone, Sudan, Togo, Uganda, and Zambia.

Habitat
However, it is also found in gardens, parks, and in and around houses.

Description
T. blandingii is a long and slender species.

Diet
T. blandingii preys upon lizards including dwarf chameleons, small mammals including bats, and birds.

Reproduction
T. blandingii is oviparous. Clutch size is 7–14 eggs.

References

Further reading
Boulenger GA (1896). Catalogue of the Snakes in the British Museum (Natural History). Volume III., Containing the Colubridæ (Opisthoglyphæ and Proteroglyphæ) .... London: Trustees of the British Museum (Natural History). (Taylor and Francis, printers). xiv + 727 pp. + Plates I-XXV. (Dipsadomorphus blandingii, pp. 77–78).
Hallowell E (1844). "Descriptions of New Species of African Reptiles". Proceedings of the Academy of Natural Sciences of Philadelphia 2: 169–172. (Dipsas blandingii, new species, pp. 170–171).
Nagy ZT, Kusamba ZC, Tungaluna GG, Lokasola AL, Kolby J, Kielgast J (2011). "Foraging acrobatics of Toxicodryas blandingii in the Democratic Republic of the Congo". Herpetology Notes 4: 91–92.
Pauwels OSG, Vogel G (2011). "Ein Fall von Thanatose (Totstellreflex) bei Boiga blandingii (Squamata, Serpentes, Colubridae) in Gabun [= A case of thanatosis (play-dead reflex) in Boiga blandingii (Squamata, Serpentes, Colubridae) in Gabon]". Elaphe 19 (4): 24–25. (in German).
Spawls S, Howell K, Hinkel H, Menegon M (2018). Field Guide to East African Reptiles, Second Edition. London: Bloomsbury Natural History. 624 pp. . (Toxicodryas blandingii, p. 511).

Colubrids
Snakes of Africa
Reptiles described in 1844
Reptiles of Angola
Reptiles of Cameroon
Reptiles of the Democratic Republic of the Congo
Reptiles of Gabon
Reptiles of Kenya